Portsoken Ward is the electoral district for Portsoken in the City of London. It returns an Alderman and four Councilmen to the Court of Common Council of the City of London Corporation.

2017 Aldermanic by-election
Michael Bear became Alderman in 2005 and resigned in 2017. This led to the first Aldermanic election in the City of London Corporation contested by the Labour Party.
The election was won by Prem Goyal, founder of the All People's Party, although he stood as an independent.

2022 Common Council election
The Common Council election in Portsoken Ward recorded the highest turnout in the 2022 Citywide Common Council Elections with 57.6% of the electorate casting their vote. The average turnout across the rest of the City of London was much lower at 36.5%. Two incumbent councillors, Munsur Ali and Jason Paul Pritchard, who were elected as Labour candidates in 2017, stood jointly and were both re-elected. John Fletcher and Henry Jones stood jointly and were both re-elected. Changes in voteshare are by party for the Labour candidates and by candidate for independent candidates who previously stood as independents.

List of Aldermen representing Portsoken ward
1891- 1921 Sir Marcus Samuel (Lord Mayor 1902–1903). He became the first Viscount Bearsted in 1925, two years before his death in 1927.
1921-1933 Isidore Jacobs excepting 19 July - 20 September 1927 when there was no alderman for Portsoken
1933-44 Sir Samuel Joseph (Lord Mayor 1942–1943)
1944-6 Edmund Dutton
1946-49 Keith Joseph son of Sir Samuel Joseph
1949-84 Sir Bernard Waley-Cohen (Lord Mayor 1960 to 1961)
1984-2006 Peter Levene, Baron Levene of Portsoken (Lord Mayor 1998 to 1999)
2006-17 Sir Michael Bear  (Lord Mayor 2010–2011)
2017–Present Prem Goyal

References

Electoral wards in the City of London